This is a list of all the reasons written by Louise Arbour during her tenure as puisne justice of the Supreme Court of Canada. During her time on the Court she wrote 68 reasons.

1999

2000

2001

2002

2003

2004

Arbour